Richard Sheppard Molony (June 28, 1811 – December 14, 1891) was a U.S. Representative from Illinois.

Born in Northfield, New Hampshire, Molony studied medicine. He graduated from Dartmouth Medical School, Hanover, New Hampshire, in 1838 and commenced the practice of his profession in Belvidere, Illinois. He served as delegate to the 1852 Democratic National Convention.

Molony was elected as a Democrat to the 32nd United States Congress (March 4, 1851 – March 3, 1853). He was not a candidate for renomination in 1852. He moved to Humboldt, Nebraska, and engaged in agricultural pursuits 1866–1891. In 1882 he declined the Democratic nomination for United States Senator from Nebraska on account of ill health. He was again a delegate to the Democratic National Convention at Chicago in 1884. He died in Humboldt, Nebraska, December 14, 1891. He was interred in Belvidere Cemetery, Belvidere, Illinois.

References

1811 births
1891 deaths
Geisel School of Medicine alumni
Democratic Party members of the United States House of Representatives from Illinois
Nebraska Democrats
19th-century American politicians
People from Merrimack County, New Hampshire
People from Humboldt, Nebraska